African Bible University (Uganda), is a private Christian university in Uganda founded and owned by African Bible Colleges.

Location
The coordinates of the university campus are:0°14'26.0"N, 32°33'53.0"E (Latitude:0.240556; Longitude:32.564722).

Overview
African Bible University (Uganda) was founded in 2005 by African Bible Colleges to "offer quality education from a Christian perspective to the surrounding countries of Sudan, South Sudan, Central African Republic, Democratic Republic of the Congo, Rwanda, Burundi, Tanzania, Kenya and Ethiopia". The university spreads across , on a hilltop that overlooks Lake Victoria.

The university is the third tertiary education Christian institution established in Africa over the past several decades. The first African Bible College was established in Liberia, West Africa in 1975. The second Bible college on the African continent was established in Malawi, Central Africa in 1991. All three institutions are recognized by the governments of their respective countries as accredited, university-level, degree-granting institutions.

Academic affairs
The college offers a four-year program which is designed to award its graduates a Bachelor of Arts degree in biblical studies, which is paired with a minor in business, communications, or Christian education.

See also
 African Bible Universities
 Education in Uganda
 List of universities in Uganda
 Lubowa

References

External links
 African Bible University Uganda Homepage
 African Bible Colleges Homepage

Universities and colleges in Uganda
Wakiso District
Educational institutions established in 2005
2005 establishments in Uganda